The Australian Speedway Masters Series (also known as the International Speedway Masters Series and the Series 500) was an annual Motorcycle speedway series of races held each Australian speedway season between 1995 and 2000.

The first of its type for motorcycle speedway in Australia, the competition featured the best riders from Australia racing against the best riders from around the world. The series was the brainchild of promoter and television commentator David Tapp who did most of the ground work as well as providing the television commentary.

After being run over 13 rounds in 1995, the years 1996, 1997 and 1998 saw the series run over 10 rounds, 1999 was run over 11 rounds and the final series in 2000 was run over 13 rounds. Events were run in the traditional 20 Heat format with Semi-finals and an "A Final". Although Australian riders won the series from 1996-2000, incredibly in the inaugural 13 round series in 1995 saw no local rider won a round.

Bunbury also hosted Round 1 of the 1996 series and in a repeat of 1995 Simon Wigg emerged victorious.

The then reigning World Champion, Sweden's Tony Rickardsson was the inaugural series winner in 1995.

Notable Riders
Some of the riders who competed in the Speedway Masters Series between 1995-2000 include:

  Leigh Adams
  Craig Boyce
  Marvyn Cox
  Jason Crump
  Glenn Doyle
  Charles Ermolenko
  Sam Ermolenko
  Billy Hamill
  Greg Hancock
  Peter Karlsson
  Mark Loram
  Shane Parker
  Mick Poole
  Tony Rickardsson
  Joe Screen
  Andy Smith
  Jan Stæchmann
  George Štancl
  Ryan Sullivan
  Piotr Świst
  Kelvin Tatum
  Mark Thorpe
  Tomáš Topinka
  Olli Tyrväinen
  Craig Watson
  Simon Wigg
  Todd Wiltshire
  Rune Holta

Tracks
Some of the tracks used in the Speedway Masters Series included:
 Avalon Raceway
 Borderline Speedway
 Brisbane Exhibition Ground
 Bunbury Speedway
 Claremont Speedway
 Fraser Park Speedway
 Gosford Speedway
 Newcastle Motordrome
 Olympic Park Speedway
 Olympic Park Stadium
 Parramatta City Raceway
 Premier Speedway
 Rockhampton Showground
 Wayville Showgrounds

Series 500 winners

References

External links
 1995 International Speedway Masters Series final
 1996 International Speedway Masters Series final
 1997 International Speedway Masters Series final

See also
 Sport in Australia

Speedway
Speedway
Motorcycle racing series